Juan Carlos Regis Adame (born 15 April 1967) is a Mexican politician from the Party of the Democratic Revolution. From 2011 to 2012 he served as Deputy of the LXI Legislature of the Mexican Congress representing Zacatecas.

References

1967 births
Living people
Politicians from Zacatecas
Party of the Democratic Revolution politicians
21st-century Mexican politicians
Deputies of the LXI Legislature of Mexico
Members of the Chamber of Deputies (Mexico) for Zacatecas